The 2018–19 Eastern Europe Cup was a season of the FIS Cross-Country Eastern Europe Cup, a Continental Cup season in cross-country skiing for men and women. The season began on 12 November 2019 in Shchuchinsk, Kazakhstan and concluded on 1 March 2020 in Kononovskaya, Russia.

Calendar

Men

Women

Overall standings

Men's overall standings

Women's overall standings

References

External links
Men's Overall standings (FIS)
Women's Overall standings (FIS)

Eastern Europe Cup
FIS Cross-Country Eastern Europe Cup seasons
2019 in cross-country skiing
2020 in cross-country skiing